Show business, sometimes shortened to show biz or showbiz (since  1945), is a vernacular term for all aspects of the entertainment industry. From the business side (including managers, agents, producers, and distributors), the term applies to the creative element (including artists, performers, writers, musicians, and technicians) and was in common usage throughout the 20th century, though the first known use in print dates from 1850. At that time and for several decades, it typically included an initial the. By the latter part of the century, it had acquired a slightly arcane quality associated with the era of variety, but the term is still in active use. In modern entertainment industry, it is also associated with the fashion industry (creating trend and fashion) and acquiring intellectual property rights from the invested research in the entertainment business.

Industry
The global media and entertainment (M&E) market, including film, television shows and advertising, streaming media, music, broadcasting, radio, book publishing, video games, and ancillary services and products was worth US$1.72 trillion in 2015, $1.9 trillion in 2016, and estimated at $2.14 trillion by 2020. About one third of the total ($735 billion in 2017) is made up by the U.S. entertainment industry, the largest M&E market in the world.

Sectors and companies

The entertainment sector can be split up into the following subsectors:

 Amusement parks
 Animation
 Circus
 Event management
 Film
 Gambling
 Game manufacturers
 Home video and home video distributors
 Media
 Music
 Politics
 Sports
 Sex business
 Talent agency
 Theatre production
 Sports entertainment

ISIC
The industry segment is covered by class "R" of the International Standard Industrial Classification: "Arts, entertainment and recreation".

See also
 Creative industries
 Cultural industry
 Cultural technology
 Light entertainment
 List of show business families
 Outline of entertainment
 This Is Show Business, television series running from 1949 to 1956
 Show Business magazine
 "There's No Business Like Show Business"

References

Entertainment industry
Performing arts